Not Even My Name is the biography of Sano Halo, who survived the Greek genocide and moved to the United States of America. The book was written by Sano Halo's daughter, Thea Halo, and first published in 2000 by Picador, an imprint of Macmillan Publishers. The biography focuses on Sano Halo's experience during and immediately after the genocide. Not Even My Name was originally published in English in the US, but it has been translated into Dutch, Icelandic, and Greek.

Summary
The book is divided into three main sections. These sections are interspersed with Thea Halo's poetry and some historical background.

Book One: The Long Journey Home

Book Two: Not Even My Name

Book Three: The Exile

Book Four: America, America

Book Five: Journey's End

Reception
Reviews

THE NEW YORK TIMES "A story of personal strength and the great triumph of mere survival"

WASHINGTON POST BOOK WORLD "Deeply moving... it is impossible to read the story of this woman's life without marveling at the strength of her spirit."

SALEM PRESS "...a triumphant narrative of exceptional magnitude. As an historian, daughter, writer of vivid and arresting prose, and standard bearer of truth, Thea Halo has thus given an invaluable gift to the world."

US NEWS & WORLD REPORT - TOP PICK

A survivor's tale from Turkish death marches in 1920 that killed thousands of ethnic Greeks. Young Themia lost family, freedom, even her name - changed to Sano by her cruel mistress. Her daughter tells the sad story with simple grace.

PUBLISHER'S WEEKLY - STARRED REVIEW

"The harrowing story of the slaughter of two million Pontic Greeks and Armenians in Turkey after WWI comes to vivid life" in this memoir by the daughter of a survivor, who has written "an eloquent and powerful account of this tragic chapter in Turkish history."

LIBRARY JOURNAL - STARRED REVIEW

The Armenian genocide in Turkey during World War I is widely known. Almost unknown, however, is the annihilation of the Pontic Greeks, who had lived for 3000 years in the Pontic Mountains near the Black Sea, by Kemal Ataturk’s military forces after the war. In 1921, one survivor, ten-year-old Sano Halo (the author’s mother), was forced with her entire village on a nearly year-long death march to Syria. …Sano’s is truly an amazing story of survival and resilience … Even more remarkable is the lack of rancor, which so often permeates survivors’ memoirs. … An important and revealing book; highly recommended for all libraries. —Ruth K. Baacke,

BOOKLIST - STARRED REVIEW "An unforgettable book" - Hazel Rochman

BOOKLIST also recommends for teens: YA: The child refugee story, the mother-daughter bond, the teenage arranged marriage, will grab teens' interest --HR

In telling her mother's epic story of survival and ultimate triumph in America, Thea Halo has written an important book about a largely unknown history: the genocide of the Pontic Greeks at the hands of the Turkish government in the years following World War I. Halo's deeply moving portrait of her mother reverberates with large moral issues that affect us all. — Peter Balakian, author of Black Dog of Fate

As written by her daughter Thea, Sano Halo's harrowing account of the destruction of her family and her world is told with such vivid detail that every page sears the mind and the heart. Not Even My Name is a work of burning intensity, self evidently powerful and true. — Nicholas Gage, author of Eleni

Publishers Weekly reviewed the book, calling it "eloquent and powerful." Peter Balakian, an American writer and translator, said, "Thea Halo has written an important book about a largely unknown history."

During WWI, thousands of Armenians and Anatolian Greeks fled Turkey, landing in northern Syria. The Red Cross fed these refugees; many were homeless and poor, forced to shelter in caves. Sano Halo traveled through Syria with these thousands of others. Before the publication of her story, it wasn't well known that Pontians sought asylum in Syria.

Pontian organizations and Greek-diaspora news sources nicknamed Sano Halo "Grandmother of the Pontian Greeks."

Sano Halo became a public figure after Macmillan released Not Even My Name, and multiple news sources reported on her death in 2014. 

Sano and Thea received honorary Greek citizenship after the book's publication.

References

Explanatory notes

See also
Greek genocide
Pontic Greeks
Dissolution of the Ottoman Empire
Turkish War of Independence
On the Quai at Smyrna
Number 31328

Works about the Greek genocide
2000 non-fiction books
Non-fiction books about immigration to the United States
Books about the Ottoman Empire
Non-fiction books about Turkey